Matador at Fifteen, a packaged release consisting of a CD of greatest hits, a CD of unreleased/rare tracks, and a DVD of its artists' music videos, was released by Matador Records on October 12, 2004, to celebrate the "15th Anniversary of contemporary rock's most self-congratulatory record label."

Track listing

Disc one: Greatest Hits 1999-2004
 Pretty Girls Make Graves - "This Is Our Emergency"
 Interpol - "Obstacle 1"
 The New Pornographers - "The Laws Have Changed"
 Mission of Burma - "Dirt"
 Cat Power - "Free"
 Stephen Malkmus - "Church on White"
 Yo La Tengo - "Don't Have to Be So Sad"
 Cornelius - "Drop"
 The Jon Spencer Blues Explosion - "Money Rock 'n' Roll"
 Dead Meadow - "The Whirlings"
 Guided by Voices - "My Kind of Soldier"
 Preston School of Industry - "Caught in the Rain"
 Bardo Pond - "Inside"
 Seachange - "Forty Nights"
 Belle and Sebastian - "Don't Leave the Light on Baby"
 Thalia Zedek - "1926"
 Matmos - "For the Trees"
 Mogwai - "Hunted by a Freak"

Disc two: Unreleased and Rarities 1999-2004
 The New Pornographers - "Graceland"
 Interpol- "Specialist"
 Pretty Girls Make Graves - "C-30 C-60 C-90 GO!"
 M. Ward - "Duet for Guitars #1"
 Stephen Malkmus and the Jicks - "It Kills"
 Mogwai - "Hunted by a Freak (Boom Bip Remix)"
 Dead Meadow - "Everything's Going On (Alternate Version)"
 Yo La Tengo - "Deeper Into Movies (Acoustic Version)"
 Mission of Burma - "Fame & Fortune (Live)"
 Guided by Voices - "Free of This World"
 Cat Power - "The Party"
 Seachange - "Seven Calls"
 Preston School of Industry - "Tone It Down (Pablo Wong Remix)"
 A.C. Newman - "Homemade Bombs in the Afternoon"
 Matmos - "Cymbals & Aspirin (A Breakthrough in Pain Relief)"
 Cornelius - "Wataridori"

Disc three: Music Videos 1999-2004 (DVD)
 Mogwai - "Stanley Kubrick"
 Pavement - "Spit on a Stranger"
 Mary Timony - "Dr. Cat"
 The Wisdom of Harry - "Ladies & Gentlemen (In the Woods)"
 Stephen Malkmus - "Discretion Grove"
 Cornelius - "I Hate Hate"
 The New Pornographers - "The Laws Have Changed"
 Interpol - "PDA"
 The Jon Spencer Blues Explosion - "She Said"
 Cat Power - "He War"
 Pretty Girls Make Graves - "This Is Our Emergency"
 Matmos - "Stars and Stripes Forever"

References

External links
 Official site

Matador Records compilation albums
2004 compilation albums
2004 video albums
Music video compilation albums
Matador Records video albums
Record label compilation albums